The South African Railways Class 5E, Series 2 of 1957 was an electric locomotive.

In 1957 and 1958, the South African Railways placed forty-five Class 5E,  electric locomotives with a Bo-Bo wheel arrangement in mainline service.

Manufacturer
The 3 kV DC Class 5E, Series 2 electric locomotive was built for the South African Railways (SAR) by Vulcan Foundry (VF) on a sub-contract from English Electric (EE), who had designed the locomotive and supplied the electrical equipment. Forty-five series 2 locomotives were delivered and placed in service in 1957 and 1958, numbered in the range from E319 to E363.

They were delivered in a bottle green livery with red cowcatchers. Yellow lines and whiskers were added later to improve their visibility. Beginning in 1960, a Gulf Red and yellow whiskers livery replaced the green and yellow. Since repainting was only done during major overhauls, some of these units were still working in their original as-delivered plain green livery without yellow whiskers as late as 1963.

Orientation
These dual cab locomotives had a roof access ladder on one side only, just to the right of the cab access door. The roof access ladder end was marked as the no. 2 end. A corridor along the centre of the locomotive connected the cabs, which were identical except that Cab 2 was where the handbrake was located.

Service
According to crews, the Class 5E gave a rough ride, which soon earned it the nickname . The successor Class 5E1 with its new design bogies gave a smoother ride.

The Class 5E entered service on the Natal mainline between Durban and Johannesburg and eventually served almost country-wide as electrification was completed on more mainlines. In 1960, sixty units of the Class 5E family were allocated to the Witbank section upon completion of its electrification. In December 1961 twelve of them were replaced by Class 32-000 diesel-electric locomotives and transferred to the newly-electrified Touws River-Beaufort West section. More followed to replace the Class 25 condensers that were being transferred from that section to Beaconsfield in Kimberley at the time.

After withdrawal from service, three Class 5E, Series 2 locomotives were sold into industrial service.
 No. E320 was sold to the Impala platinum mine in Rustenburg.
 No. E343 and E356 were sold to the Driefontein gold mine near Carletonville.

Works numbers
The EE and VF works numbers of the Class 5E, Series 2 and their known disposal are listed in the table.

Illustration
The main picture shows Series 2 no. E326 and E319 and Series 1 no. E297, departing Touws River heading northeast towards Beaufort West in September 1984. The following pictures show the SAR Gulf Red and the Driefontein gold mine liveries. An overhead view of the locomotive is shown in a picture taken at an accident scene near Olifantsfontein in 1975.

References

2790
Bo-Bo locomotives
Vulcan Foundry locomotives
English Electric locomotives
Cape gauge railway locomotives
Railway locomotives introduced in 1957
1957 in South Africa